"Good Goodbye" is a promotional single by American rock band Linkin Park, featuring guest vocals from American rapper Pusha T and British rapper Stormzy. The song is a promotional single from their seventh studio album, One More Light. The song was written by Linkin Park members, with Pusha T and Stormzy writing their own verses. The song was released for download on April 13, 2017.

Background
According to Mike Shinoda, the song was thought of very early in the process of creating the album. He came up with the hook and the track in a day while working alone with Jesse Shatkin. Mike originally had two verses on the song and wanted to add an electronic drop to the bridge, but it didn't sound good and he thought a third rap verse by him would be too much, so they started thinking about who they could bring in on the track for rap verses. That ended up being Pusha T (who was previously featured on DJ Vice's remix of "I'll Be Gone") and Stormzy.

Explaining how the collaboration with Stormzy came together, Shinoda said:

According to Chester Bennington, Stormzy had been on the band's radar for quite a while.

Music video
A lyric video for "Good Goodbye" was directed by Rafatoon and released on April 13, 2017, on Linkin Park's official YouTube channel. During a Facebook chat on April 2, 2017, Mike Shinoda announced Linkin Park was working on a new video for a new song that is "not super silly, but it's still not very serious," commenting that it was a change of pace for the band. It was later revealed that the music video was for the song "Good Goodbye". It has been filmed in Los Angeles over a day, and Stormzy, who is featured on the track, flew out to be a part of it.

The official music video was later released by the band on YouTube on May 5, 2017. Featuring NBA legend and former basketball player Kareem Abdul-Jabbar, the videogame-inspired visual features Chester, who has to score points in a basketball dunk contest to save his life, while having Abdul-Jabbar play as the judge keeping score. The video is intercut with shots of Bennington, Shinoda, Pusha T and Stormzy performing their verses.

Commenting on the video to Billboard for an episode of the Ballin' Out podcast, Bennington later said, "In keeping with the theme of basketball, the video we shot [for 'Good Goodbye'] features, in my opinion, the greatest player of all time is the emperor of a dunk contest to the deaths in which I have to go up against round after round of dunking on dudes to save my life. I think we're kind of known for our more serious stuff but this is a fun distraction from being so serious all the time."

As of February 2022, the song has 60 million views on YouTube.

Personnel
Linkin Park
 Chester Bennington – vocals, backing vocals
 Rob Bourdon – drums, backing vocals, percussion
 Brad Delson – guitars, backing vocals
 Dave "Phoenix" Farrell – bass guitar, backing vocals 
 Joe Hahn ("Mr. Hahn") – samples, backing vocals, programming
 Mike Shinoda – rap vocals, keyboards, backing vocals

Additional musicians
 Pusha T – vocals
 Stormzy – vocals

Production
 Composition – Brad Delson, Mike Shinoda, Jesse Shatkin, Terrance Thornton and Michael Omari
 Vocal production – Andrew Bolooki
 Additional production – Jesse Shatkin

Notes
  Signifies a vocal producer
 Credits from streaming website.

Charts

References

Songs about parting
2017 songs
Linkin Park songs
Pusha T songs
Stormzy songs
2017 singles
Warner Records singles
Song recordings produced by Jesse Shatkin
American hip hop songs
Songs written by Chester Bennington
Songs written by Mike Shinoda
Songs written by Brad Delson
Songs written by Jesse Shatkin
Songs written by Pusha T
Songs written by Stormzy
Electropop songs